Rhamphomyia angulifera is a species of dance fly in the family Empididae. It is included in the subgenus Pararhamphomyia.

References

Rhamphomyia
Insects described in 1913
Asilomorph flies of Europe